Dactylethrella is a genus of moths in the family Gelechiidae. The genus was described by Thomas Bainbrigge Fletcher in 1940 and is a replacement name for Dactylethra Meyrick (preoccupied).

Species
The species of this genus are:

Dactylethrella bryophilella (Walsingham, 1891) (from Gambia)
Dactylethrella candida (Stainton, 1859) (from Sri Lanka)
Dactylethrella catarina  Pnomarenko  (from China)
Dactylethrella chionitis (Meyrick, 1910) (from South Africa)
Dactylethrella globulata (Meyrick, 1910) (from Sri Lanka)
Dactylethrella incondita (Meyrick, 1913) (from Sri Lanka)
Dactylethrella leuconota Bidzilya & Mey, 2011 (from Namibia)
Dactylethrella siccifolii (Walsingham, 1881) (from South Africa)
Dactylethrella shenae Li & Zheng, 1998 (from China)
Dactylethrella tegulifera (Meyrick)  (from China)
Dactylethrella tetrametra (Meyrick, 1913) (from South Africa)

References

External links

https://europepmc.org/article/cba/312668

 
Chelariini